Sulitjelma Chapel is a chapel of the Church of Norway in Fauske Municipality in Nordland county, Norway. It is located in the village of Sulitjelma. It is an annex chapel in the Sulitjelma parish which is part of the Salten prosti (deanery) in the Diocese of Sør-Hålogaland. The small, red, wooden chapel was built in a long church style in 1996 on the site of the new church graveyard on the south side of the village since the old graveyard for the Sulitjelma Church had no more room to expand.

See also
List of churches in Sør-Hålogaland

References

Fauske
Churches in Nordland
Wooden churches in Norway
20th-century Church of Norway church buildings
Churches completed in 1996
1996 establishments in Norway